Lee Alan Fleisher is an American anesthesiologist. In 2020, Fleisher was named Chief Medical Officer and Director of the Centers for Medicare & Medicaid Services Center for Clinical Standards and Quality. He previously served as Chair of Anesthesiology and Critical Care at the Perelman School of Medicine at the University of Pennsylvania.

Early life and education
Fleisher graduated Cheltenham High School and began his undergraduate degree at the University of Pennsylvania in 1978. He completed his Bachelor's degree in Molecular Biology in 1981, graduating six months early, and his medical degree from Renaissance School of Medicine at Stony Brook University. He initially intended to pursue a career as a transplant surgeon and researcher but changed his mind following his surgical residency. As a result, he changed his interest towards anesthesiology to do critical care but enjoyed practicing anesthesiology more.

Career
Following his medical degree, Fleisher served as both vice chairman for clinical investigation and clinical director of operating rooms at the Johns Hopkins School of Medicine (JHU). He left JHU in 2004 to replace David Longnecker as the Chairman of the Perelman School of Medicine at the University of Pennsylvania (UPenn). During his early career at UPenn, Fleisher focused on the assessment of risk and defining best practices for patients undergoing noncardiac surgery. He also Chaired the American Heart Association/American College of Cardiology Task Force on Guidelines on Perioperative Cardiovascular Evaluation. As a result of his research, Fleisher was elected a member of the National Academy of Medicine (then referred to as the Institute of Medicine).

As a result of his research, Fleisher served on a 13-member panel of investigators working towards the National Academy of Sciences, Engineering, and Medicine report on the Safety and Quality of Abortion Care in the United States. In July 2020, during the COVID-19 pandemic, Fleisher was named the Chief Medical Officer and Director of the Centers for Medicare & Medicaid Services Center for Clinical Standards and Quality. In this capacity, he is responsible for executing all national clinical, quality, and safety standards for healthcare facilities and providers, as well as establishing coverage determinations for items and services that improve health outcomes for Medicare beneficiaries.  While serving in his new role, Fleisher co-authored the article Charting a Roadmap for Value-based Surgery in the Post-pandemic Era in the Annals of Surgery journal. Working with the Centers for Disease Control and Prevention, Fleisher co-authored the article Health Care Safety during the Pandemic and Beyond — Building a System That Ensures Resilience in the New England Journal of Medicine.

Selected publications
Essence of Anesthesia Practice: Expert Consult
Anesthesia and Uncommon Diseases
Essence of Anesthesia Practice
Complications in Anesthesia

References

External links

Living people
University of Pennsylvania alumni
Stony Brook University alumni
University of Pennsylvania faculty
Johns Hopkins University faculty
American anesthesiologists
Members of the National Academy of Medicine
Year of birth missing (living people)
United States Department of Health and Human Services officials